Giorgi Kvilitaia (born 1 October 1993) is a Georgian professional footballer who plays as a striker for Cypriot First Division club APOEL and the Georgia national team.

Career
Kvilitaia was born in Abasha, Georgia.

In 2016 Kvilitaia signed for Austrian Bundesliga club Rapid Wien.

On 17 September 2020 he joined Anorthosis.

He moved to APOEL on 3 June 2021.

Career statistics

Club

International goals
Scores and results list Georgia's goal tally first.

References

External links

MLSZ 
HLSZ 

1993 births
Living people
People from Abasha
Footballers from Georgia (country)
Georgia (country) international footballers
Georgia (country) under-21 international footballers
Association football forwards
Győri ETO FC players
FC Dila Gori players
Nemzeti Bajnokság I players
Expatriate footballers from Georgia (country)
Expatriate footballers in Hungary
Expatriate sportspeople from Georgia (country) in Hungary
FC Sasco players
FC Dinamo Tbilisi players
SK Rapid Wien players
Erovnuli Liga players
Austrian Football Bundesliga players
Expatriate footballers in Austria
Expatriate sportspeople from Georgia (country) in Austria
K.A.A. Gent players
Anorthosis Famagusta F.C. players
APOEL FC players
Expatriate sportspeople from Georgia (country) in Cyprus